DFA Compilation, Vol. 1 is a compilation of tracks by various artists signed to the dance-punk label The DFA. The only two tracks contributed here that were not produced by  The DFA are "Endless Happiness" and "Cone Toaster", both by Black Dice. The compilation was released on September 30, 2003.

Track listing
 The Juan MacLean - "By the Time I Get to Venus" – 5:12
 LCD Soundsystem - "Give It Up" – 3:56
 The Rapture - "House of Jealous Lovers" – 5:07
 Black Dice - "Cone Toaster" – 8:57
 The Juan Maclean - "You Can't Have It Both Ways [Live]" – 9:21
 The Rapture - "Silent Morning" – 6:48
 LCD Soundsystem - "Losing My Edge" – 7:53
 Black Dice - "Endless Happiness" – 15:26

Dance-punk albums
DFA Records albums
Record label compilation albums
2003 compilation albums
DFA Records compilation albums